Montalba-le-Château is a commune in the Pyrénées-Orientales department in southern France.

Geography

Localisation 
Montalba-le-Château is located in the canton of La Vallée de la Têt and in the arrondissement of Prades.

Population

See also
Communes of the Pyrénées-Orientales department

References

Communes of Pyrénées-Orientales
Fenouillèdes